The Unity Coalition (Coalición Unidad) was a Costa Rican political coalition of right-wing opposition parties made in the 70s and oppose to the then ruling centre-left National Liberation Party. Four parties made the coalition; Democratic Renewal, Christian Democrats, People's Union and Republican Calderonista. After a primary election from which Rodrigo Carazo Odio was victorious the coalition presented him as candidate winning the 1978 elections. Eventually the Coalition merged forming the Social Christian Unity Party in 1983.

References

Christian democratic parties in North America
Defunct political parties in Costa Rica